Jimmy James (15 February 1915–4 July 1992) was a New Zealand dancer, dance teacher and cabaret proprietor. He was born in Athens, Greece on 15 February 1915.

References

1915 births
1992 deaths
New Zealand dance teachers
New Zealand male dancers
Greek emigrants to New Zealand